Stars in Fast Cars is a motoring-themed celebrity game show, in which celebrities compete in motoring challenges, including recreating movie stunts and racing modified armchairs. The series was first broadcast on BBC Three, in 2005, and repeated on BBC One in 2006.

Among some of the more notable moments were Car Skittles; a stunt where the guests had to drive on to the back of a moving lorry, before letting them all drive a Ferrari – with a bathtub of water attached to the back which they were not allowed to spill. They were asked to race in a variety of motor-esque machines, from the aforementioned armchairs to Formula 1 cars.

The final round of each show, between the two top-ranking guests, features the use of the car cannon in attempts to hit various things.

The show originated as a one-off special of the popular BBC Two show, Top Gear, and was produced, as were a number of other television specials, in aid of charity Comic Relief for Sport Relief in 2004. It was later turned into a series, presented by Dougie Anderson.

Episodes and participants
This list is incomplete (episodes 3-10 are missing). You can help Wikipedia by adding verifiable data to it.

Pilot
The Top Gear special feature for Sport Relief, first broadcast on 10 July 2004.

The pilot was presented by Top Gear presenters Richard Hammond and James May, with Jeremy Clarkson amongst the "stars" competing. The special featured a rare appearance on New Top Gear from Fifth Gears Tiff Needell.Results:1st = : Jodie Kidd
1st = : Jeremy Clarkson
3rd = : Alan Davies
4th = : Jimmy "Carrnage" (Carr)
4th = : Darren Jordon
6th = : Patrick Kielty

Episode one
This episode introduced the regular presenter, Dougie Anderson.Competitors:Sarah Cawood
Jon Culshaw
Sir Steve Redgrave
Gina Yashere

This episode recreated stunts from movies, and featured racing in modified armchairs and towing a bath full of water with a Ferrari. The two highest scorers after three rounds used the "Car Catapult" to hurl the car of their choice at giant coconuts.

Episode twoCompetitors:'
David Dickinson
Jenny Frost
Nina Wadia
Tommy Walsh

Other participants
The following notable people are included amongst those who took part in other episodes: Edwina Currie, Ben Fogle, Charlie Dimmock, Steve Furst, Arabella Weir, Shane Lynch, Jilly Goolden, Ainsley Harriott, Jake Maskall, Nell McAndrew, Leanne Wilson, Reggie Yates, Trevor Nelson, Jennie Bond, Beverley Turner, Shane Lynch, Will Mellor and Rowland Rivron

External links
 BBC press release, 8 August 2005 – about new programming for that season

2005 British television series debuts
2006 British television series endings
Top Gear
BBC television game shows
2000s British game shows